Hickling may refer to:

Places
Norfolk, England
 Hickling, Norfolk, village and parish
 Hickling Broad
 Hickling Green
 Hickling Heath

Nottinghamshire, England
 Hickling, Nottinghamshire

Other uses
Hickling (surname)